Renz is a German-language surname.

People 
 Andreas Renz (born 1977), German ice hockey player
 Bettina Renz, German political scientist 
 Martina Ertl-Renz (born 1973), German former alpine skier
 Thomas Maria Renz (born 1957), German theologian

See also 
 Circus Renz, historical circus in Germany
 Circus Herman Renz, the largest circus of the Netherlands

German-language surnames